Ranaghat Government Polytechnic,  is a new government polytechnic located in Ranaghat,  Nadia district, West Bengal.

About college
This polytechnic is affiliated to the West Bengal State Council of Technical Education,  and recognized by AICTE, New Delhi. The polytechnic offers diploma courses in Automobile, Electrical, and Mechanical Engineering.

See also

References

External links
Official website WBSCTE

Universities and colleges in Nadia district
Technical universities and colleges in West Bengal
2016 establishments in West Bengal
Educational institutions established in 2016